Abdul Karim Abbasi is a senior lawyer and Bangladeshi politician.  Former Whip and Member of Parliament of Netrokona-1.

Career
Abbasi was elected to parliament from Netrokona-1 as a Bangladesh Nationalist Party candidate in 1991, 1996 and 2001. In 2006, he joined Liberal Democratic Party and became senior vice-president of Liberal democratic party

References

Bangladesh Nationalist Party politicians
Living people
5th Jatiya Sangsad members
8th Jatiya Sangsad members
1938 births